LWFC may refer to:

Lake Wendouree Football Club
Like Water for Chocolate (novel), a novel by Laura Esquivel
Like Water for Chocolate (film), a film based on the book
Like Water for Chocolate (album), an album by Common
Lochore Welfare F.C., a Scottish football club
London Welsh F.C., an English non-league football club